Sture Nordlund (22 November 1919 – 14 December 1973) was a Swedish sports shooter. He competed in the 50 m pistol event at the 1948 Summer Olympics.

References

External links
 

1919 births
1973 deaths
Swedish male sport shooters
Olympic shooters of Sweden
Shooters at the 1948 Summer Olympics
People from Kramfors Municipality
Sportspeople from Västernorrland County
20th-century Swedish people